The Shin-Yokohama Line may refer to either of the following railways in Yokohama, Kanagawa, Japan:
 Tōkyū Shin-Yokohama Line operated by Tōkyū Railways
 Sōtetsu Shin-Yokohama Line operated by Sagami Railway
 The two lines provide through service at Shin-Yokohama Station.